The Vought XF5U "Flying Flapjack" was an experimental U.S. Navy fighter aircraft designed by Charles H. Zimmerman for Vought during World War II. This unorthodox design consisted of a flat, somewhat disc-shaped body (hence its name) serving as the lifting surface. Two piston engines buried in the body drove propellers located on the leading edge at the wingtips.

Design and development
A developed version of the original V-173 prototype, the XF5U-1 was a larger aircraft. Of all-metal construction, it was almost five times heavier, with two 1,400 hp (1,193 kW) Pratt & Whitney R-2000 radial engines. The configuration was designed to create a low aspect ratio aircraft with low takeoff and landing speeds but high top speed. The aircraft was designed to keep the low stall speed and high angle of attack from the V-173 prototype while providing for better pilot visibility, cockpit comfort, less vibration, and provisions to install armament. This included a cockpit redesign moving the cockpit from the leading edge of the wing to a nose nacelle that extended further in front of the leading edge. The arrestor hook was changed to a dorsal hook that would diminish the drag from the apparatus.

 Normally, a wing with such a low aspect ratio will suffer from very poor performance due to the degree of induced drag created at the wingtips, as the higher pressure air below spills around the wingtip to the lower-pressure region above. In a conventional aircraft, these wingtip vortices carry a lot of energy with them and hence create drag. The usual approach to reducing these vortices is to build a wing with a high aspect ratio, i.e. one that is long and narrow. However, such wings compromise the maneuverability and roll rate of the aircraft, or present a structural challenge in building them stiff enough. The XF5U attempted to overcome the tip vortex problem using the propellers to actively cancel the drag-causing tip vortices. The propellers are arranged to rotate in the opposite direction to the tip vortices, with the aim of retaining the higher-pressure air below the wing. With this source of drag eliminated, the aircraft would fly with a much smaller wing area, and the small wing would yield high maneuverability with greater structural strength.

The propellers envisioned for the completed fighter — unlike the torque-reducing counter-rotating propellers of the V-173 design — were to have a built-in cyclic movement like a helicopter's main rotor, with a very limited ability to shift their center of lift up and down to aid the aircraft in maneuvering. Initially, the aircraft used propellers originally designed for the V-173  prototype. These propellers would be replaced with propellers taken from the Vought F4U-4 Corsair. An ejection seat was fitted to allow the pilot to clear the massive propellers in the event of an in-flight emergency. Although the prototype was unarmed, a combination of six M2 Browning 50-caliber machine guns or four M3 20 mm cannons would be mounted in the wing roots in service.

Testing and evaluation
The XF5U design was promising: specifications given at the time promised great maneuverability and speeds up to 452 mph (727 km/h). However, it came at the time when the United States Navy was switching from propeller driven to jet propelled aircraft. By 1946, the XF5U-1 project was already long over its expected development time, and well over budget. With jet aircraft coming into service, the Navy finally canceled the project on 17 March 1947, and the prototype aircraft (V-173) was transferred to the Smithsonian Museum for display. Although two aircraft were constructed, a lone XF5U-1 underwent ground runs but never overcame vibration problems. Taxi trials at Vought's Connecticut factory culminated in short "hops" that were not true flights. The only completed XF5U-1 proved to be so structurally solid that it had to be destroyed with a wrecking ball.

Specifications (XF5U-1)

See also

References

Notes

Bibliography

 Chant, Christopher. Fantastic Aircraft. New York: Gallery Books, 1984. .
 Ginter, Steve. Chance Vought V-173 and XF5U-1 Flying Pancakes (Naval Fighters Number Twenty-one). Simi Valley, CA: Steve Ginter Publishing, 1992. .
 Guyton, Boone and Paul Marcus. "The Ups and Downs of The Flying Pancake." True, July 1951. Vol. 29, no. 170.
 Jerram, Michael E. Incredible Flying machines: An Anthology of Eccentric Aircraft. New York: Exeter Books, 1980. .
 Norton, Bill. U.S. Experimental & Prototype Aircraft Projects: Fighters 1939-1945. North Branch, Minnesota: Specialty Press, 2008, pp. 165–168. .
 XF5U Standard Aircraft Characteristics. Washington, DC: Naval Historical Center at the U.S. Navy Yard. Retrieved: 25 July 2009.
 Winchester, Jim. "Vought XF5U-1". Concept Aircraft: Prototypes, X-Planes and Experimental Aircraft. Kent, UK: Grange Books plc., 2005. .
 Winchester, Jim. "Vought V-173 and XF5U-1 'Flapjack' (1942)". X-Planes and Prototypes. London: Amber Books Ltd., 2005. .

External links

 The XF5U story
 Chance Vought Flying Flapjack
 Story and Photos at vought.org
 Chance Vought V-173 & XF-5 U1 Flying Pancakes

F05U
Circular wing
Carrier-based aircraft
Cancelled military aircraft projects of the United States
Aircraft with counter-rotating propellers
Twin piston-engined tractor aircraft